Fernando de Jesús Canales Clariond (born July 21, 1946 in Monterrey) is a Mexican politician and businessman affiliated with the National Action Party . He succeeded his cousin, Benjamín Clariond as governor of Nuevo León in 1997. He also served as Secretary of Economy and as Secretary of Energy in the cabinet of Vicente Fox.

Fernando Canales is the son of Fernando Canales Salinas and Consuelo Clariond. Consuelo is the daughter of Jacques Antoine Clariond ("Santiago Antonio Clariond), founder of Industrias Monterrey, and his wife María Garza. IMSA is nowadays one of the leading business groups in Latin America.

During his youth he briefly considered the Catholic priesthood  but finally opted-in for a bachelor's degree in law from the Escuela Libre de Derecho. Later on he received an MBA from the Monterrey Institute of Technology and Higher Education (ITESM) and specialized in industrial relations at the Institute of Social Studies of The Hague, in the Netherlands.

In the private sector Canales has served as chief executive officer and vice president of IMSA and as a member of the board in several companies in the United States, Colombia, Venezuela, Argentina, Chile and Mexico.

Politically, he is a member of the right-of-center National Action Party since 1978. He became its 1985 nominee for the Nuevo León governorship but lost against Jorge Treviño of the Revolutionary Institutional Party (PRI). Twelve years later he reattempted it and won, becoming the first governor of the PAN in the history of the state.

As a governor, Canales delivered mixed results. He left the post after being invited to the federal cabinet by President Vicente Fox and was appointed Secretary of Economy on January 15, 2003. His former treasurer, Fernando Elizondo, assumed as interim but Elizondo lost the governorship in the July 2003 elections against Natividad González Parás, Canales' leading opponent six years earlier.

See also 
 1997 Nuevo León state election

References

External links

1946 births
Living people
Governors of Nuevo León
Members of the Chamber of Deputies (Mexico)
National Action Party (Mexico) politicians
Mexican chief executives
Politicians from Monterrey
Monterrey Institute of Technology and Higher Education alumni
Mexican people of French descent
20th-century Mexican politicians
21st-century Mexican politicians
Escuela Libre de Derecho alumni